The 27th Golden Eagle Awards took place in Changsha, Hunan, China, on October 12, 2014.

Winners

References

External links
 List of Winners of the 27th Golden Eagle Awards 

2014
2014 in Chinese television
2014 television awards
Events in Changsha
Mass media in Changsha